Carl Talmage "Duke" Washington (October 3, 1933 – February 16, 2017) was a former American football running back from Pasco, Washington, famous for his play for Washington State University.

Football career 
He is thought of by many as the greatest running back in Pasco High School history. His accomplishments at PHS and later with the Washington State Cougars in the early and middle 1950’s compare to other great backs of his day. Still, Duke Washington is best known as the first black man to ever play in the University of Texas’ Memorial Stadium.

Washington, a captain on the 1954 WSU squad, was given the option to not play against the Longhorns in their home stadium, which had an “unofficial” rule that forbid blacks from playing either for or against Texas. The WSU Cougar administration said “no Washington, no game” and, despite having to stay at a private home instead of with the team in the hotel the night before, played well in the Cougar loss. In addition to becoming the first black athlete to play football in Memorial Stadium, Washington also became the first black athlete to score a touchdown in Memorial Stadium, torching the Longhorn defense in a 40-14 losing effort.

Duke Washington’s momentous color-breaking game and touchdown run are just one of many accomplishments he achieved on the gridiron. He played in the 1954 East West Shrine Game, helped the Cougars beat the University of Washington in the Apple Cup three out of four times, and ran for 115 yards in a win at Oregon State University despite suiting up as a fullback. Duke’s career at Washington State was good enough to attract the attention of the National Football League and the Philadelphia Eagles, who drafted Washington in 1955. After a year there, he was released and eventually found employment as a Seattle-area art teacher, a Vice Principal at Seattle's Franklin High School and Assistant Dean of Students at the University of Washington, not to mention as a fine artist and art collector in his own right.

In the fall of 2009, Duke Washington was inducted into the Washington State University Athletic Hall of Fame.

Washington died on February 16, 2017, at the age of 83 from complications with pneumonia.

References 

1933 births
2017 deaths
American football fullbacks
Deaths from pneumonia in the United States
People from Pasco, Washington
People from Forest, Mississippi
Players of American football from Mississippi
Washington State Cougars football players